Justin Cook (born January 10, 1976) is an American voice actor, voice director, audio engineer and line producer who works for anime-dubbing companies Funimation and Okratron 5000. He is most noted for his work on Yu Yu Hakusho and the Dragon Ball franchise.

Filmography

Voice roles

Anime dubbing
 Aquarion - Kurt Click
 Aquarion Evol - Donar
 Assassination Classroom - Akira Takaoka
 Attack on Titan - Jurgen
 Baccano! - Dune
 Basilisk - Yashamaru
 BECK: Mongolian Chop Squad - Tsunemi Chiba
 Big Windup! - Hiroyuki Oda
 Black Cat - Baldorias S. Fanghini
 Black Clover - Jack the Ripper
 Blood-C: The Last Dark - Iori Matsuo
 Case Closed - Yaiba, Dr. Hasseleman, Masked Yaiba, Sammy Hammerstoltz, Various Additional Voices
 Casshern Sins - Plug (Ep. 7)
 D.Gray-man - Daisya Barry
 Danganronpa: The Animation - Leon Kuwata
 Darker Than Black - Louis (Ep. 1)
 Desert Punk - Akio Kawaguchi
 Dragon Ball series - Raditz, Cell Jr., Dende, Evil Buu, Super Buu, Devilman, Lionel, Frouge, Planthorr, King Nikochan, Captain Dark, Tsukutsun Tsun, Shu (DB Movie 3 Only)
 Dragon Ball Z: Battle of Gods - Dende
 Dragon Ball Super: Broly - Raditz
 Dragon Ball Super: Super Hero - Dende
 Dragonaut - The Resonance - Ostrum
 Eden of the East - Ishii (Ep. 5)
 Evangelion 1.0: You Are (Not) Alone - Toji Suzuhara
 Evangelion: 2.0 You Can (Not) Advance - Tōji Suzuhara
 Fairy Tail - Totomaru
 Fruits Basket - Hatsuharu Sohma
 Fruits Basket (2019) - Hatsuharu Soma
 Fullmetal Alchemist - Russell Tringham
 Fullmetal Alchemist: Brotherhood - Neil
 Hell Girl - Mamoru Hanagasa (Ep. 3)
 High School DxD - The Towji (Ep. 7)
 ID: Invaded - Tamotsu Fukuda/Anaido
 Kamisama Kiss - Tasaki (Kurama's Manager, Ep. 11)
 Kiddy Grade - Cesario
 Kodocha - Mr. Ohki
 Lupin III: Island of Assassins - Jack
 Mass Effect: Paragon Lost - Brood
 Michiko and Hatchin - Rico (Ep. 4)
 My Bride is a Mermaid - Dynamite Ginji
 My Hero Academia - Eijiro Kirishima
 Oh! Edo Rocket - Knees
 Ōkami-san and her Seven Companions - Saruwatari (Eps. 5, 11)
 One Piece (Funimation dub) - Eustass Kid, Bellamy
 One Piece: Stampede - Eustass Kid
 Ouran High School Host Club - Gangster A
 Panty & Stocking with Garterbelt - Omori (Ep. 5B)
 Peach Girl - Juro
 Sgt. Frog - Karara's Father 
 Shakugan no Shana - Marcosias (Seasons 2–3, Movie)
 Shin-chan (Funimation dub) - Ham Solo
 Show by Rock!! - Strawberry Heart, Grateful King
 Speed Grapher - Yashiro
 The Day I Became a God - Ashura Kokuhō
 Trinity Blood - Dietrich von Lohengrin
 We Without Wings - Daisuke Domon / Bunnie D
 Yu Yu Hakusho - Yusuke Urameshi, Seiryu, Kuro Momotaro

Video games
 BloodRayne 2 – Minions
 Borderlands: The Pre-Sequel – Lost Legion Infantry #2, Prankster Lost Legion Soldier
 Dragon Ball series - Raditz, Evil Buu, Super Buu, Cell Jr., Devilman, Dende (adult) (English dub)
 Spikeout: Battle Street - Additional voices
 Yu Yu Hakusho: Dark Tournament - Yusuke Urameshi (English dub)

Live action
 Adventures in Voice Acting - Himself

Crew

Chief Producer
 Dimension W

Line Producer/Producer
 Absolute Duo
 Akuma No Riddle
 Baki the Grappler
 B Gata H Kei: Yamada's First Time
 Burst Angel
 Case Closed
 Citrus
 Desert Punk
 Dragon Ball (series)
 Fairy Tail
 Fruits Basket
 Fullmetal Alchemist
 The Galaxy Railways
 Guilty Crown
 Gunslinger Girl
 Highschool DxD
 Kiddy Grade
 Kodocha
 Lupin III
 Michiko and Hatchin
 Mushi-Shi
 Nabari no Ou
 One Piece (Funimation dub)
 Sakura Taisen: Ecole de Paris
  Panty and Stocking with Garter belt
 Samurai 7
 Soul Eater
 Spiral
 Trigun
 xxxHOLIC
 Yu Yu Hakusho
Serial Experiments Lain

Associate Producer
 Fire Force

ADR director
 Fruits Basket
 Kiddy Grade
 Yu Yu Hakusho
 Strike Witches: The Movie

ADR engineer
 Fruits Basket
 Kiddy Grade

References

External links

Living people
American audio engineers
American male video game actors
American male voice actors
American voice directors
Funimation
Male actors from Texas
People from Lubbock, Texas
Television producers from Texas
Year of birth missing (living people)